Roger Joseph McGough  (born 9 November 1937) is an English poet, performance poet, broadcaster, children's author and playwright. He presents the BBC Radio 4 programme Poetry Please, as well as performing his own poetry. McGough was one of the leading members of the Liverpool poets, a group of young poets influenced by Beat poetry and the popular music and culture of 1960s Liverpool. He is an honorary fellow of Liverpool John Moores University, fellow of the Royal Society of Literature and President of the Poetry Society.

Early life
McGough was born in Litherland, Lancashire, on the outskirts of Liverpool, to Roger Francis, a docker, and Mary (McGarry) McGough. His ancestry is Irish and he was raised in the Roman Catholic faith. He was a pupil at St Mary's College in Crosby with Laurie Taylor, future sociologist and criminologist, before going on to study French and Geography at the University of Hull. McGough lived in one of the university residences, Needler Hall, for three years from 1955 and served as hall librarian. Contemporaneously, the poet Philip Larkin became the university's librarian; newly arrived at Hull, he served as a sub-warden at Needler Hall, though he lived in private accommodation nearby. Several years later McGough corresponded with Larkin about poetry, sending him some of his own poems as he still lacked the confidence to approach the man directly. Larkin replied, thanking McGough for the poetry, which he had enjoyed reading. He added that he believed that McGough walked an impressionistic tightrope which, though exhilarating, meant that on occasion he fell off.

The Scaffold and Grimms
Returning to Merseyside in the early 1960s, he worked as a French teacher and, with John Gorman, organised arts events.  McGough and Gorman later met Mike McGear (Mike McCartney) and together formed the trio The Scaffold; they worked the Edinburgh Festival Fringe until they were signed to Parlophone records in 1966. The Scaffold performed a mixture of comic songs, comedy sketches and the poetry of McGough. The group scored several hit records, reaching number one in the UK Singles Chart in 1968 with their version of "Lily the Pink". McGough wrote the lyrics for many of the group's songs and also recorded the musical comedy/poetry album McGough and McGear.

In 1971 Grimms was formed, originally as a merger of the Scaffold, the Bonzo Dog Band and the Liverpool Scene. Group member Neil Innes said about the formation of the group: "I don't know what attracted the Scaffold to the Bonzos; we were incredibly anarchic, which was probably something shared by the Scaffold as well."

Poetry
As a poet, McGough came to national prominence through the publication of The Mersey Sound in 1967. The Mersey Sound is an anthology of poetry by three Liverpool poets: McGough, Brian Patten, and Adrian Henri. It went on to sell over 500,000 copies, becoming one of the bestselling poetry anthologies of all time; remaining in continuous publication, it was revised in 1983 and again in 2007. The title of the anthology was a conscious association of the three Liverpool poets with the musical phenomenon caused by the eruption of the Beatles and associated bands from the same city, known collectively as the "Merseybeat", on the world. McGough's personal connection with the Beatles was referenced in a much later comic poem, "To Macca's Trousers", contained in the book That Awkward Age (2009). McGough discovered a long forgotten pair of Paul McCartney's blue mohair trousers in his attic; the trousers had been given to him, via McCartney's brother Mike, in the early 1960s.

One of McGough's early poems, Let Me Die a Youngman's Death (but not, as the poem states, before the poet reaches 73, 91 or 104 years of age), was included in a BBC anthology of the British nation's hundred favourite poems. McGough has been nicknamed "the patron saint of poetry" by Carol Ann Duffy.

Philip Larkin included McGough's poetry in The Oxford Book of Twentieth Century English Verse, which he edited in 1973. Writing to McGough in 1980, Larkin congratulated him on the well-thumbed state of the copies of his books in Hull University's library, when compared to Larkin's own.

Possibly his shortest, most memorable and overtly political poem, was entitled "Conservative Government Unemployment Figures". The text of poem repeats the words of the title, with layout and punctuation resulting in an arch critique. The poem was referenced in a parliamentary debate in the House of Commons in 2004.

The poetry of McGough has been the subject of academic study. It has been characterised, at least from its early examples, as being reliant on play with words and their meanings. It has also been noted to exhibit a stylised wit, and, at times, a sadness based on themes of lost youth, unfulfilled relationships, and the downside of city life. The form of some of his verse, it has been claimed, has been influenced by his experience of writing song lyrics. A major critical examination of McGough's poetry, by American academic Ben Wright, was published in 2006. The author's stated aim was "to examine and evaluate the accessibility of Roger McGough's message to a wide, general readership, as well as appraising it by the most rigorous literary standards". McGough's popularity, commercial success, use of humour, and the lack of pretension of his verse has tended to restrict appreciation of his work as "serious poetry". Wright's study challenges this under-appreciation.

Other activities

McGough was responsible for much of the humorous dialogue in the Beatles' animated film Yellow Submarine, although he did not receive an on-screen credit.

On 2 March 1978, McGough appeared in All You Need Is Cash, a mockumentary detailing the career of a Beatles-like group called the Rutles. Interviewed by Eric Idle, the introduction of McGough takes so long that he is only asked one question, "Did you know the Rutles?" to which McGough cheerfully responds "Oh yes", before the documentary is forced to move along to other events. In 1980 he recited a high-speed one-minute version of Longfellow's poem "The Wreck of the Hesperus", complete with sound effects, on the album Miniatures produced by Morgan Fisher.

One of McGough's more unusual compositions was created in 1981, when he co-wrote an "electronic poem" called Now Press Return with the programmer Richard Warner for inclusion with the Welcome Tape of the BBC Micro home computer. Now Press Return incorporated several novel themes, including user-defined elements to the poem, lines which changed their order (and meaning) every few seconds, and text which wrote itself in a spiral around the screen. He contributed poetry to and narrated a programme in 1991 for Channel 4 called Equinox: The Elements about the elements. He made a guest appearance on quiz panel show QI in 2006.

Three plays written by the 17th-century French playwright Molière have been translated by McGough and directed by Gemma Bodinetz. Tartuffe premièred at the Liverpool Playhouse in May 2008 and transferred subsequently to the Rose Theatre, Kingston. The Hypochondriac (The Imaginary Invalid) was staged at the Liverpool Playhouse in July 2009. The Misanthrope was staged at the Liverpool Playhouse in February–March 2013 before touring with the English Touring Theatre.

McGough has also done some voiceover work narrating The Very Hungry Caterpillar and Other Stories by Eric Carle, and TV advertisements for the supermarket chain Waitrose.

He is a patron of Barnes Literary Society. In 2019 he became the President of Arts Richmond for one year.

Awards
McGough won a Cholmondeley Award in 1998, and was appointed an Officer (OBE) in 1997, and later, in 2004, Commander (CBE) of the Order of the British Empire. 

He holds an honorary MA from Nene College of Further Education, and honorary Doctor of Letters (D.Litt.) degrees from the University of Hull (2004), Roehampton University (2006), and the University of Liverpool (2006). He was made a Fellow of the Royal Society of Literature in 2004.

Academic posts
McGough was Fellow of Poetry at Loughborough University (1973–75), Honorary Fellow at John Moores University, and Honorary Professor at Thames Valley University (1993).

Personal life
In 1970, McGough married Thelma Monaghan, and they had two children; they divorced in 1980. He married Hilary Clough in December 1986, with whom he has two children. He lives in Barnes, south west London; he and Clough previously lived on Portobello Road in Notting Hill Gate.

Books

Poetry collections 
Young Commonwealth Poets '65, Heinemann, 1965
 The Mersey Sound (with Adrian Henri and Brian Patten), Penguin, 1967
Frinck, A Life in the Day of, and Summer with Monika: Poems, Joseph, 1967
Watchwords, Cape, 1969
After the Merrymaking, Cape, 1971
Out of Sequence, Turret Books, 1972
Gig, Cape, 1973
Sporting Relations, Eyre Methuen, 1974
In the Glassroom, Cape, 1976
Mr Noselighter, André Deutsch, 1976
Holiday on Death Row, Cape, 1979
Unlucky for Some, Bernard Stone, 1980
Waving at Trains, Cape, 1982
Crocodile Puddles, New Pyramid Press, 1984
Sky in the Pie, Puffin, 1985 (children's)
Melting into the Foreground, Viking, 1986
Noah's Ark, Dinosaur, 1986
Worry, Toni Savage, 1987
Nailing the Shadow, Viking Kestrel, 1987
Counting by Numbers, Viking Kestrel, 1989
Selected Poems, 1967–1987, Cape, 1989
You at the Back: Selected Poems, 1967–87, Cape, 1991
Defying Gravity, Viking, 1992
Pen Pals: A New Poem, Prospero Poets, 1994
Ferens, the Gallery Cat, Ferens Art Gallery, 1997
Todays Yodal, Over years ago, 1999
Until I Met Dudley, Frances Lincoln, 1997
The Way Things Are, Viking, 1999
Dotty Inventions, Francis Lincoln, 2002
Everyday Eclipses, Viking, 2002
Collected Poems, Viking, 2003
That Awkward Age, Penguin, 2009
As Far As I Know, Penguin, 2012
Joinedupwriting, Viking, 2019
"Safety In Numbers", Viking, 2021

Plays
 Tartuffe (English adaptation of Molière's play)
 The Hypochondriac (English adaption of Molière's play)
 The Misanthrope (English adaptation of Molière's play)

Autobiography
Said And Done, Random House, 2005

See also
Liverpool poets

References

External links

 
 
 Profile and poems written and audio at Poetry Archive
 
 Interview with Roger McGough about 40 years of the Mersey Poets
 BBC Radio 4 archive 4 October 1981 (Audio, 12 minutes). BBC profile.
 James Campbell, "A life in poetry: Roger McGough", The Guardian, 22 August 2009
 National Portrait gallery
 Shahesta Shaitly, Roger McGough: This much I know, The Observer, 4 November 2012
Scaffold and the Grimms history

People from Litherland
Alumni of the University of Hull
Commanders of the Order of the British Empire
Fellows of the Royal Society of Literature
People associated with Loughborough University
20th-century English poets
20th-century British poets
1937 births
Living people
Poets from Liverpool
People educated at St Mary's College, Crosby
English people of Irish descent
The Scaffold members
Grimms members
English autobiographers
Presidents of the Poetry Society